Glycoprotein IX (platelet) (GP9) also known as CD42a (Cluster of Differentiation 42a), is a human gene.

Platelet glycoprotein IX (GP9) is a small membrane glycoprotein found on the surface of human platelets. It forms a 1-to-1 noncovalent complex with glycoprotein Ib (GP Ib), a platelet surface membrane glycoprotein complex that functions as a receptor for von Willebrand factor (VWF; MIM 193400) (known as the Glycoprotein Ib-IX-V Receptor Complex). The main portion of the receptor is a heterodimer composed of 2 polypeptide chains, an alpha chain (GP1BA; MIM 606672) and a beta chain (GP1BB; MIM 138720), that are linked by disulfide bonds. The complete receptor complex includes noncovalent association of the alpha and beta subunits with GP9 and platelet glycoprotein V (GP5; MIM 173511).[supplied by OMIM]

See also
 Cluster of differentiation

References

Further reading

External links
 
 

Clusters of differentiation